

88001–88100 

|-id=071
| 88071 Taniguchijiro ||  || Taniguchi Jiro (1947–2017), a Japanese manga artist who was awarded the French ministry of Culture's Chevalier de l´Ordre des arts et des Lettres in 2011. His main works are "Chichi no koyomi" ("Le journal de mon pere"), "Bocchan no jidai" ("Au temps de Botchan") and "Harukana machi-e" ("Quartier lointain"). || 
|}

88101–88200 

|-id=146
| 88146 Castello ||  || The archaeological site Castello lies on a hill in the Swiss village of Tremona. This site contains human settlements from the fifth millennium B.C. to the thirteenth century A.D || 
|}

88201–88300 

|-id=260
| 88260 Insubria ||  || Regio Insubria, the old Latin name of western Lombardia, northern Italy, home of the discovery site || 
|-id=292
| 88292 Bora-Bora ||  || Bora Bora, French Polynesia. The tropical island, located 240 km northwest of Tahiti, is famed for its multicolored lagoon. Formerly Mai Te Pora ("created by the gods"), Bora Bora means "first born", because it was the first to emerge from the waters after the creation of Raiatea, some seven million years ago. || 
|-id=297
| 88297 Huikilolani ||  || "Hui Kilolani" is the Hawaiian Astronomical Society's Hawaiian name, which means "club of sky watchers" (Src). || 
|}

88301–88400 

|-bgcolor=#f2f2f2
| colspan=4 align=center | 
|}

88401–88500 

|-id=470
| 88470 Joaquinescrig ||  || Joaquín Escrig Ferrando (1945–1999) cousin and friend of Spanish discoverer Rafael Ferrando. He was an inspiration to him in his desire for living and strength in overcoming adversity. || 
|}

88501–88600 

|-bgcolor=#f2f2f2
| colspan=4 align=center | 
|}

88601–88700 

|-id=611
| 88611 Teharonhiawako ||  || Teharonhiawako, son of the granddaughter of the Great Spirit creation god, in the Haudenosaunee (Iroquois) creation myth, and his twin brother Sawiskera ((88611) Teharonhiawako I Sawiskera) || 
|}

88701–88800 

|-id=705
| 88705 Potato || 2001 SV || The potato, on the occasion of the United Nations' International Year of the Potato (2008), and because many minor planets are believed to be shaped like potatoes || 
|-id=795
| 88795 Morvan ||  || Morvan massif, the northern part of the Massif Central of France || 
|}

88801–88900 

|-id=874
| 88874 Wongshingsheuk ||  || Wong Shing Sheuk (born 1951) began teaching in 1974. From 1988 to his retirement in 2011, he was the principal of Po Leung Kuk Leung Chow Shan Primary School P.M. He believed that astronomy could inspire a student's interest in science and he put tremendous effort into astronomy education. || 
|-id=875
| 88875 Posky ||  || the Hong Kong Po Leung Kuk Education Department for their efforts over the past seven years in supporting student exploration of the sky. || 
|-id=878
| 88878 Bowenyueli ||  || The motto of the Chinese University of Hong Kong is bowenyueli, which means "Through learning and temperance to virtue". These words of Confucius have long been considered a principal precept of his teaching. The University lays equal emphasis on the intellectual and moral aspects of education || 
|-id=879
| 88879 Sungjaoyiu ||  || Joseph Jao-yiu Sung (born 1959) is the vice-chancellor of the Chinese University of Hong Kong, associate dean of the Faculty of Medicine and head of Shaw College. During the 2003 atypical pneumonia, Sung played a leading role in combating the disease and was called "Asia Hero" by Time magazine || 
|}

88901–89000 

|-id=906
| 88906 Moutier ||  || The Swiss village of Moutier, located in the Bernese Jura || 
|-id=961
| 88961 Valpertile ||  || Valerio Pertile (1932–2005) was a skilled and dedicated Italian astronomical technician and night assistant at the Schmidt telescope of the Asiago Station from 1965 to 2000. He took the major fraction of the 16,000 plates acquired with that telescope, a most precious archive of photographic data. || 
|}

References 

088001-089000